Abita Springs is a town in St. Tammany Parish, Louisiana, United States. The population was 2,365 at the 2010 census, up from 1,957 in 2000. It is part of the New Orleans–Metairie–Kenner Metropolitan Statistical Area.

History

Abita Springs was originally a Choctaw Indian village, taking its name from nearby medicinal springs. The Choctaw burial and execution grounds, which were in use up until around 1880, are located nearby.

Geography
Abita Springs is located at  (30.476233, -90.035138).

Demographics

As of the 2020 United States census, there were 2,631 people, 1,010 households, and 636 families residing in the town.

As of the census of 2000, there were 1,957 people, 757 households, and 550 families residing in the town. The racial makeup of the town was 95.30% White, 3.01% African American, 0.31% Native American, 0.36% Asian, 0.31% from other races, and 0.72% from two or more races. 1.79% of the population were Hispanic, or Latino of any race.

There were 757 households, out of which 37.5% had children under the age of 18 living with them, 58.0% were married couples living together, 12.2% had a female householder with no husband present, and 27.3% were non-families. 22.3% of all households were made up of individuals, and 8.9% had someone living alone who was 65 years of age or older. The average household size was 2.59 and the average family size was 3.07.

In the town, the population was spread out, with 28.5% under the age of 18, 6.1% from 18 to 24, 32.0% from 25 to 44, 22.7% from 45 to 64, and 10.6% who were 65 years of age or older. The median age was 35 years. For every 100 females, there were 86.7 males. For every 100 females age 18 and over, there were 85.1 males.

The median income for a household in the town was $39,923, and the median income for a family was $45,208. Males had a median income of $36,250 versus $27,368 for females. The per capita income for the town was $16,998. 6.7% of the population and 4.7% of families were below the poverty line. Out of the total population, 4.4% of those under the age of 18 and 11.6% of those 65 and older were living below the poverty line.

Economy 

The Abita Brewing Company was established in 1986 as a microbrewery, and in 1994, they added a brew pub and restaurant. Abita's beer is brewed with the pure water of the artesian wells in Abita Springs.

The UCM Museum (pronounced "you see 'em", and also known as the "Abita Mystery House") is an Abita Springs tourist attraction.  The museum features an eclectic collection of antiques (particularly electronics and arcade games) and dozens of examples of proprietor John Preble's folk art, which ranges from the whimsical to the macabre.

The Abita Springs Opry is "a non-profit organization dedicated to the presentation and preservation of Louisiana roots music".  "The Opry" presents six concerts per year of roots music by performers from throughout the United States. The concerts are presented in the auditorium of the Abita Springs Town Hall. The concerts are broadcast on a number of radio stations and on the Southeastern Channel and public-access television cable TV channels throughout the USA.

Education
St. Tammany Parish Public Schools operates local public schools:
 K-3: Abita Springs Elementary School (Abita Springs)
 4-6: Abita Springs Middle School (Abita Springs)
 7-8: Fontainebleau Junior High School (unincorporated St. Tammany Parish)
 9-12: Fontainebleau High School (unincorporated St. Tammany Parish)

Notable people
Dick Hart, professional golfer
David Lohr, crime writer
Bunny Matthews, cartoonist and writer
Michael G. Strain, veterinarian and the incumbent Louisiana Agriculture and Forestry Commissioner

References

External links

 Town of Abita Springs official website
 Abita Mystery House
 AbitaSports.com

Towns in Louisiana
Towns in St. Tammany Parish, Louisiana
Towns in New Orleans metropolitan area